Vadim Muntagirov is a Russian ballet dancer. He is currently a principal dancer at The Royal Ballet in London and previously a lead principal dancer at the English National Ballet.

Early life 
Muntagirov, was born in Chelyabinsk, Russia. His parents and elder sister are ballet dancers. At age nine, he entered Perm State Choreographic College, where his parents and sister trained, and trained there for six years. In 2006, after he won a scholarship at the Prix de Lausanne, despite not speaking English, he chose to relocate to London and trained at The Royal Ballet School. He planned to stay for a year, but Gailene Stock, then-director of the school, convinced him to continue his training there. He graduated in 2009.

Career
In 2009, after Muntagirov graduated, he joined the English National Ballet as First Artist. During his first season, he danced Albrecht in Giselle and the Prince in Cinderella.

In 2010, Muntagirov was promoted to First Soloist. He was chosen to perform Prince Siegfried Swan Lake with guest star Polina Semionova, but he rehearsed the role with Daria Klimentová, 19 years his senior. However, Semionova had to withdraw from opening night as she did not have a visa, so Klimentová stepped in and performed. The performance received critical acclaim, and their partnership was compared to Margot Fonteyn and Rudolf Nureyev's partnership. The rehearsals and performance was featured in the BBC4 documentary Agony and Ecstasy: A Year with English National Ballet.
Since then, the two were paired together frequently. Klimentová noted it is a partnership she waited 20 years for.

Muntagirov was promoted to Principal in 2011 and Lead Principal in 2012. He performed lead roles such as Conrad in Le Corsaire, the poet in Les Sylphides and the title role in Apollo, and originated the role of the Prince in Wayne Eagling's The Nutcracker. In 2013, he won the Prix Benois de la Danse for the Prince in The Sleeping Beauty.

In January 2014, Muntagirov announced that he would join The Royal Ballet as a Principal Dancer. He made his debut in the company as the Prince in The Sleeping Beauty, with Akane Takada as Princess Aurora. Later that year, he returned to ENB to dance at Klimentová's final performance, which was Romeo and Juliet. At the Royal Ballet, he danced lead roles such as Solor in La Bayadère, Des Grieux in Manon, Colas in La Fille mal gardée and the Young Man in The Two Pigeons. In 2019, he won his second Prix Benois de la Danse, this time for Prince Siegfried in Swan Lake.

Muntagirov is a Permanent Guest Artist in the National Ballet of Japan, and had made guest appearances with Paris Opera Ballet, Mariinsky Ballet in St. Petersburg and American Ballet Theatre in Washington D.C.. Muntagirov had also taught in Klimentová's masterclass in Prague. In June 2020, in the first series of performance since the Royal Opera House's closure due to the 2019-20 coronavirus pandemic, which was broadcast online, Muntagirov performed Frederick Ashton's Dance of the Blessed Spirits, which he learned from Anthony Dowell in 2016.

Selected repertoire

English National Ballet
Albrecht in Giselle
The Prince in Cinderella
Prince Siegfried in Swan Lake
The poet in Les Sylphides
Romeo in Rudolf Nureyev's Romeo and Juliet
Apollo
The Prince in The Sleeping Beauty

Created roles
The Prince in Wayne Eagling's The Nutcracker

The Royal Ballet
Basilio in Don Quixote
Albrecht in Giselle
Prince Siegfried in Swan Lake

Aminta in Sylvia
Prince Florimund in The Sleeping Beauty
Prince in Peter Wright's The Nutcracker
Colas in La Fille mal gardée
The Young Man in The Two Pigeons 
Lensky in Onegin
Romeo in Kenneth MacMillan's 'Romeo and JulietDes Grieux in ManonJack/Knave of Hearts in Alice’s Adventures in WonderlandFlorizel in The Winter’s TaleDon José in CarmenLt Colonel Vershinin in Winter Dreams"Diamonds" in JewelsSymphonic VariationsTchaikovsky Pas de deuxWithin the Golden HourSources:

 Awards 
Laureate at Prix de Lausanne
Second place and silver medal at Arabesque competition
First place and gold medal at Vaganova Prix competition
First place at Youth America Grand Prix''
2010 Critics’ Circle National Dance Award for Outstanding Male Performance (Classical)
2015 and 2018 Best Male Dancer at the Critics’ Circle National Dance Awards
2013 and 2019 Prix Benois de la Danse

Sources:

References

Principal dancers of The Royal Ballet
Russian male ballet dancers
People educated at the Royal Ballet School
1990 births
Living people
Prix Benois de la Danse winners
People from Chelyabinsk
English National Ballet principal dancers
Russian expatriates in England
Perm State Choreographic College